Compliance Ireland was formally established in January 2004, but informally commenced in mid-2003.  It is a private company, but uniquely it writes on, and contributes to, numerous debates in Ireland about corporate governance and compliance on an independent basis.  Compliance Ireland is frequently quoted in newspapers, government reports, television, radio and Wikipedia.

Compliance Ireland has been both a measured critic and supporter of the Financial Regulator and Central Bank since the two entities were loosely joined in 2003 following a wide sweeping regulatory review commenced by Michael McDowell (former T.D, Minister for Justice and Tánaiste) in the late 1990s and published in 2001.

References

Corporate governance
Economy of Ireland